Wu Qiong (born 28 April 1989) is a Chinese field hockey player.

She competed for the China women's national field hockey team at the 2016 Summer Olympics.

References

1989 births
Living people
Chinese female field hockey players
Olympic field hockey players of China
Field hockey players at the 2016 Summer Olympics